Igor Konstantinovich Varitsky is a retired ice hockey player who played in the Soviet Hockey League. He was born on April 25, 1971 in Chelyabinsk, Soviet Union and played for Traktor Chelyabinsk, Severstal Cherepovets, and Metallurg Magnitogorsk. He was inducted into the Russian and Soviet Hockey Hall of Fame in 1993.

Varitsky was the world champion in 1993 and he also won the Russian Cup in 1998.

Career statistics

Regular season and playoffs

International

External links
 
 Russian and Soviet Hockey Hall of Fame bio
 

1971 births
Living people
Avtomobilist Yekaterinburg players
Hannover EC players
Metallurg Magnitogorsk players
Severstal Cherepovets players
HC Vítkovice players
Ice hockey players at the 1994 Winter Olympics
Kassel Huskies players
Olympic ice hockey players of Russia
Soviet ice hockey forwards
Russian ice hockey coaches
Russian ice hockey forwards
Salavat Yulaev Ufa players
Traktor Chelyabinsk players
Sportspeople from Chelyabinsk
Russian expatriate sportspeople in Germany
Russian expatriate sportspeople in the Czech Republic
Expatriate ice hockey players in Germany
Expatriate ice hockey players in the  Czech Republic
Russian expatriate ice hockey people